Aulonia is a genus of wolf spiders first described by Carl Ludwig Koch in 1847. , it contains only two species.

References

Lycosidae
Araneomorphae genera
Palearctic spiders
Spiders of Asia